Wang Ying may refer to:

Wang Ying (Tang dynasty) (died 877), rebel to the Tang Dynasty
Wang Ying (Water Margin), fictional character in the Water Margin
Wang Ying (Ming dynasty), author of Shiwu bencao Food Materia Medica, see List of sources of Chinese culinary history
Wang Ying (ROC) (1895–1951), Chinese military commander and Japanese puppet warlord
Wang Ying (actress) (1913–1974), Chinese actress
Wayne Wang (born 1949), Chinese American film director
Wang Ying (actor) (born 1957), Chinese male actor
Wang Ying (softball) (born 1968), Chinese softball player
Wang Ying (composer) (born 1976), Chinese composer
Wang Ying (ice hockey) (born 1981), Chinese ice hockey player
Wang Ying (wrestler) (born 1983), Chinese wrestler
Wang Ying (water polo) (born 1988), Chinese water polo player
Wang Ying (footballer) (born 1997), Chinese soccer player